The Battle of Chi Lăng Pass was a short skirmish between Vietnamese forces under Prince Lê Lợi and Chinese Ming dynasty army under General Liu Sheng. The battle took place in the Chi Lăng valley, Chi Lăng District, Northeast Vietnam on September 18, 1427.

A large Chinese force under the command of Liu Sheng had been dispatched to relieve Wang Tong, who was besieged at Đông Quan in the aftermath of the Battle of Tốt Động – Chúc Động. At first, the Vietnamese pretended to flee, leading the charging Chinese cavalry into the marshes near Dao Ma Pha mountain where Chinese horses were bogged down, ambushed, and slaughtered.

References

Bibliography

Chi Lăng
Chi Lăng
Chi Lăng
15th century in Vietnam
1427 in Asia